Pirquinozol (SQ-13,847) is a drug which was investigated as an antiallergen and antiasthmatic agent in the early 1980s but was never marketed. Notably, pirquinozol is not an antihistamine, though it does block the release of histamine evoked by allergens, and it does not bind to β-adrenergic receptors either.

References 

Antiasthmatic drugs
Abandoned drugs
Primary alcohols
Lactams
Ureas
Heterocyclic compounds with 3 rings
Nitrogen heterocycles